William Corin (13 October 1867- 2 March 1929) was an English-born electrical engineer, who undertook some of the early design of the Snowy Mountains Hydro-Electricity Scheme in Australia.

He was born in Kent, England and was educated at King's College School and University College, London.  He worked as a civil engineer after graduating until 1891 when he became an electrical engineer.  He migrated to Tasmania in 1895.

In Australia his interest in electrical engineering took off.  He designed the Duck Reach Power Station and made early surveys for the Great Lakes schemes.  In 1907 he was made Chief Electrical Engineer to the New South Wales Department of Public Works.  He was in charge of the generation of thermal electricity.  In 1915 he commenced writing a series of reports on a Snowy River scheme. In 1920 Corin estimated the cost of the Snowy River scheme at £2 million and that it would produce 1,500GwH of power. He worked for both the British and French Governments on projects in Fiji and New Caledonia. Finding working in the Government uncongenial he resigned in 1923 to undertake private consulting.

He died of cancer in Sydney in 1929 and is buried in the Northern Suburbs cemetery.

Corin Dam in the Australian Capital Territory is named after him.

References

External links
 Australian Dictionary of Biography Entry

1867 births
1929 deaths
People educated at King's College School, London